Hugh Martin (1914–2011) was an American musical theater and film composer, arranger, vocal coach, and playwright.

Hugh Martin may also refer to:

 Hugh Martin (minister, born 1822) (1822–1885), Scottish minister of the Free Church of Scotland
 Hugh Martin (minister, born 1890) (1890–1964), British Christian student leader, active in the ecumenical movement, and a publisher
 Hugh Martin (cricketer) (born 1947), South African cricketer

See also
 Hugh M. Morris or Hugh Martin Morris (1878–1966), United States district judge
 Hugh Murray (rugby union) or Hugh Martin Murray (1912–2003), Scottish international rugby union player
 Hugh Martin McGurk, former dual player from Northern Ireland